Rajeev Alunkal is a prominent poet, lyricist, music director and malayalam orator. He is best known for writing lyrics on romantic and philosophical themes. He has written numerous poems and songs. He is the former Chairman of Kumaranashan Smarakam, Pallana, Govt of Kerala. he is the current Vice President of a national organization called "Sun India - Save our Nation", an anti-drug initiative. Rajeev has penned lyrics for songs in about 130 movies, of which a few are worth mention – Vettom, Mallu Singh Kanaka Simhaasanam, Oru Marubhoomikkadha, Romans, Sound Thoma, Chattakkari, Angry babies, Aamayum Muyalum, Happy Wedding, Kuttanadan Marpappa, Aanakallan.

He won URF National Record (2021) for 4200 songs in three lyrics areas (Drama, Album, Cinema)

He has received Kerala Sangeetha Nataka Academy Award in 2012 for lifetime achievement as lyricist. He achieved this award at the age of 39 and nobody has received such an award so far in history. Since then, he has written lyrics for 350 songs for more than 130 films. He has also written more than 1000 songs for 250 professional dramas and 2800 songs for 280 albums.

Rajeev Alunkal co-operated with music directors of three to four generations, namely V.Dakshinamoorthy, M.K.Arjunan, A.R.Rahmam, Raveendran, M.Jayachandran and Gopi Sundar, and most Indian Singers.

He won the Kerela State Award for Best Lyricist in 2004 (Drama), and he won the Kerala Film Critics Association Awards in three times (2006, 2012 and 2018)

Rajeev Alunkal got the opportunity to work with A R Rahman for the album "One Love" which acted to ensure the position of the Taj Mahal among the 7 Wonders of the World, on the behalf of the Government of India

During the canonisation ceremony of Mother Teresa at the Vatican, Pope Francis released the poem "Theresamma"  written by Rajeev Alunkal, and the Indian Pop singer Usha Uthup rendered her voice for the same. This poem has also been translated into other languages including English, Bengali, Albanian, Latin and Tamil.

Life and career
Rajeev Alunkal was born to the late Kandanatt S. Madhavan Nair and the late Karuvally R. Indira at Kadakkarappally Village in the Cherthala Taluk, Alappuzha District on 17 August 1973 and settled with family in the same place.

His first poem was published in 1987 at the age of 14 in the Nair Service Society's (NSS) Service Weekly. The poem won Mannam Trophy for best upcoming poet. He became a professional lyricist in 1994 in drama through Cherthala Shylaja Theatres. He made his debut in Malayalam film industry through the 2003 Malayalam movie  Hariharanpillai Happiyanu. Music composed by Stephen Devassy and the song Thinkal Nilavil became iconic.

In 2016, Rajeev got the chance to represent India at the South Asian Poet Meet held in Malaysia. On the occasion, he recited his poem that holds the principlesof humanity as its core, titled "Verukalude Vedhantham"

For about a quarter if a century, he has been to many universities, colleges and schools in India, interacting with scholars and intellectuals. As an motivational speaker, Rajeev Alunkal has delivered about 1000 speeches in and outside India, on topics that include, but are not limited to, cultural diversity and heritage of India, Advocating the importance of languages and art. 

The composition by Rajeev Alunkal for Energy Management Center (EMC), an initiative that advocates conservation of energy and environment, is a widely accepted and celebrated song.

Filmography
Maharaani (2022)

Power Star (2022)

Nalla Samayam (2022)

The Hacker (2022)

Paappan (2022)

Udumbu (2021)

Vidhi (The Verdict) (2021)

Vellaaramaram Kunnile Vellimeenukal (2021)

Oru Vadakan Pennu (2020)

An International Local Story (2019)

Anakkallan (2018)

Chilappol Penkutty (2018)

Mere Pyara Desh Vasioum (2018)

Vaasavam (2018)

Shirk (2018)

Gagultha (2018)

Miyame (2018)

Theetta rappayi (2018)

Thakazhiyude kaatha (2018)

Devayanam (2017)

Shirk (2017)

Zebravarakal (2017)

The wrong turn (2017)

Melle (2017)

Kinginikootam (2017)

Nadodikal (2017)

Super Lotto Sukumaran (2017)

Rajalakshmi (2017)

Thenvarikka (2017)

Marubhoomikal (2017)

Vedam (2016)

Cell Phone (2016)

Aaradi (2016)

Happy Wedding (2016)

Kaatu Maakkan (2016)

Girls (2016)

One Day (2015)

She Taxi (2015)

Thousand (2015)

Swantham Ilanjikkavu P O (2015)

Ashamsakalode anna (2015)

ATM (2015)

Thakkali (2015)

I Phone (2015)

Aamayum Muyalum (2014)

Kaasu panam thuttu (2014)

Masala Republic (2014)

Study Tour (2014)

Medulla Oblongata (2014)

Flat No.4B (2014)

Angry Babies (2014)

Good, Bad & Ugly (2014)

Mithram (2014)

Nadodimannan (2013)

India today (2013)

Silence (2013)

KQ (2013)

Sound Thoma (2013)

BuntyChor (2013)

Mercury (2013)

Sadharanakkaran (2013)

Black Butterfly (2013)

Bangles (2013)

Lillies of March (2013)

My Fan Ramu (2013)

Mallu Singh (2012)

Chattakkari (2012)

Husbands in Goa (2012)

Romans (2012)

Isacc Newton Son of Philipose (2012)

Ponnu kondoru Alroopam (2012)

Njanum Ente Familyum (2012)

No.66 Madhura Bus (2012)

Ardha Naari (2012)

Arabeem Ottakom P. Madhavan Nayarum (2011)

Father's Day (2011)

Mrs Husbands (2011)

Jockie (2011)

Killadi Raman (2011)

My Dear Kuttichattan (new version) (2011)

Lucky Jockers (2011)

Sarkar Colony (2011)

Uppukandam Brothers (Part 2) (2011)

Kottarathil Kutty Bhootham(2011)

Ulakam Chuttum Valiban (2011)

Pachuvum Kovalanum (2011)

Oru Small Family (2010)

The Metro (2010)

Perumal (2009)

Sketch (2009)

Bharya Onnu Makkal Moonnu (2009)

Kancheepurathe Kalyanam (2009)

Love in Singapore (2009)

Hailesa (2009)

Akasha Gopuram(2009)

Bhagavaan (2009)

Hareendran Oru Nishkalankan (2008)

Anasuya (2008)

Homam (2008)

Rakshakan (2007)

Akasam (2007)

Black Cat (2007)

Indrajith (2007 film)

Malliswari the Prince (2007)

Anjiloral Arjunan (2007)

Bada Dosth (2006)

Kanaka Simhasanam (2006)

Colourful (2006)

Chathrapathi (2006)

Dubai Seenu (2006)

Kanal (2006)

Nilaavu Pole (2006)

Arya (2005)

Monolisa (2005)

Students (2004)

Vettam (2004)

Pranayamayi (2004)

Komban (2003)

Wanted (2003)

Mambazhakaalam (2003)

Hariharanpillai Happiyanu (2002)

Poems

 Ekakikalude geetham
 Achanum njaanum
 Theresamma
 Naaniyamma
 Aaro oral
 Kaatumallika
 Puravritham
 Deeptham
 Yudasinu nandi
 Kannaki
 Verukalude Vedantham
 Anaghashayan
 Iniyetra naal
 Enikkammayilla
 Kunnikkuruvinte Maruku

Published books

 Nilavilitheyyam- A collection of poems (2008)- Paridhi Publications, Thiruvananthapuram
 Ente Priyageethangal – 1001 Selected songs (2009)  – H&C Publications, Thrissur
 Verukalude Vedantham – A collection of poems (2015) – DC Books, Kottayam
 Pallotti Mittayi – A Collection of Children's Poem (2021) – Poorna Publications, Kozhikode.
 Kanalpennu - A Collection of Poems (2022) — Maani Books, Alappuzha

Poems 

Ekakikalude geetham
  Achanum Njaanum
  Theresamma
  Naaniyamma
  Aaro oral
  Enik Ammayilla
  Kannaki
  Verukalude Vedantham
  Anaghashayan
  Iniyetranaal
  Enikkammayilla
  Kanalpennu
  Gangashankaram

Awards

References

External links
 Official Website

1973 births
Living people
Malayali people
Malayalam poets
Indian lyricists
Recipients of the Kerala Sangeetha Nataka Akademi Award